The inaugural 2015 Women's Rugby Super Series was an international women's rugby union competition contested by World Cup holders England, runners-up Canada, New Zealand and the United States.

The Super Series succeeded the Nations Cup, another international tournament organized jointly by the United States, England and Canada with rotating host locations. Guest teams from other nations also took part, most recently South Africa. Canada took home the last Nations Cup beating England and ending their 17-game winning streak. The format changed with a round-robin tournament now being played over three days in three locations, Calgary, Red Deer and Edmonton.

The tournament winners were New Zealand, with runners-up England, the United States third and finally Canada.

Table

Points scoring
4 points awarded for a win, 2 points for a draw, no points for a loss. 1 bonus point awarded for scoring four or more tries and 1 bonus point for losing by less than 7 points.

Fixtures and results

Day one

Assistant referees:
Rose Labreche (Canada)
Robin Kaluzniak (Canada)

Assistant referees:
 Marie Lematte (France)
 David Crisp (Canada)

Day two

Assistant referees:
Leah Berard (United States)
Robin Kaluzniak (Canada)

Assistant referees:
Rose Labreche (Canada)
Doug Hamre (Canada)

Day three

Assistant referees:
Sherry Trumbull (Canada)
Doug Hamre (Canada)

Assistant referees:
Marie Lematte (France)
David Crisp (Canada)

See also
Women's international rugby

References

Women's Rugby Super Series
International women's rugby union competitions hosted by Canada
2015 rugby union tournaments for national teams
2015 in women's rugby union
2015–16 in English rugby union
2015 in New Zealand rugby union
2015 in Canadian rugby union
2015 in American rugby union
2015 in English women's sport
2015 in Canadian women's sports
2015 in American women's sports